Tetanocera robusta is a species of fly in the family Sciomyzidae. It is found in the  Palearctic and Nearctic
The larvae develop in aquatic pulmonate snails including Gyraulus, Helisoma, Lymnaea, Physa, Planorbis. The habitat is marshy borders of lakes and ponds and permanent marshes.

References

External links
Images representing Tetanocera robusta at BOLD

Sciomyzidae
Insects described in 1847
Taxa named by Hermann Loew
Diptera of Europe
Palearctic insects